The Big Show (Spanish: Altas variedades) is a 1960 French-Spanish drama film directed by Francisco Rovira Beleta and starring Christian Marquand,  Agnès Laurent and Ángel Aranda.

Cast
   Christian Marquand as Walter  
 Agnès Laurent  as Ilona  
 Ángel Aranda  as Rudolf 
 Vicky Lagos as Rosita  
 Marisa de Leza as Rita 
 José María Caffarel  as Valera 
 Mari Carmen Yepes 
 Luis Induni  as Representante del Circo Austriaco 
 Mario Bustos
 Jesús Puche 
 Camino Delgado
 Ventura Oller as Amigo de Walter  
 Fernando Rubio as Amigo de Walter  
 Ramón Quadreny 
 Manuel Bronchud  as Amigo de Walter
 Antonia Manau
 Carmen Correa
 Gaspar 'Indio' González 
 Francisco Bernal 
 María Fernanda Ladrón de Guevara  as Doña Mercedes
 Julia Martinez

References

Bibliography
 de España, Rafael. Directory of Spanish and Portuguese film-makers and films. Greenwood Press, 1994.

External links

1960 films
French drama films
Spanish drama films
1960s Spanish-language films
Films directed by Francisco Rovira Beleta
1960s Spanish films